That's Right! is an album by jazz cornetist Nat Adderley and the Big Sax Section released on the Riverside label featuring Adderley with his brother Cannonball Adderley, Jimmy Heath, Charlie Rouse, Yusef Lateef, Tate Houston, Wynton Kelly, Jim Hall/Les Spann, Sam Jones, and Jimmy Cobb.

Reception
The Allmusic review by Ron Wynn states "Nat Adderley has seldom played with more fire, verve, and distinction as he does on That's Right!".  The Penguin Guide to Jazz awarded the album 3½ stars stating "That's Right is a bit of an oddity, with Nat's cornet placed in front of what was billed, quite accurately, as the Big Sax Section".

Track listing
All compositions by Nat Adderley except as indicated
 "The Old Country" (Curtis Lewis, Adderley) - 3:56  
 "Chordnation" (Jimmy Heath) - 6:11  
 "The Folks Who Live On the Hill" (Jerome Kern, Oscar Hammerstein II) - 4:15  
 "Tadd" (Barry Harris) - 4:17  
 "You Leave Me Breathless" (Frederick Hollander, Ralph Freed) - 4:16  
 "Night After Night" (Joe Bailey) - 2:29  
 "E.S.P." (Harris) - 3:49  
 "That's Right!" - 8:44  
Recorded in New York City on August 9 & September 15, 1960

Personnel
Nat Adderley – cornet 
Cannonball Adderley - alto saxophone 
Jimmy Heath, Charlie Rouse - tenor saxophone
Yusef Lateef - tenor saxophone, flute, oboe
Tate Houston - baritone saxophone
Wynton Kelly - piano
Jim Hall (tracks 2, 3 & 5), Les Spann (tracks 1, 4 & 6-8) - guitar
Sam Jones - bass
Jimmy Cobb - drums

References

1960 albums
Riverside Records albums
Nat Adderley albums
Albums arranged by Jimmy Heath